Water Colour Society of Ireland (WCSI) is a watercolour society in Ireland, founded in 1870. The Society held its first exhibition in the Courthouse, Lismore, County Waterford in May 1871.

History
The Water Colour Society of Ireland (WCSI) was founded in 1870 as the Amateur Drawing Society by an informal group of six well-connected women from County Waterford, Baroness Pauline Prochazka, Harriet Keane, Frances Keane, Henrietta Phipps, Fanny Currey and Fanny Musgrave. Eight years after its founding, the organisation briefly became the "Irish Fine Art Society" before settling to its current name in 1888. The stated objective of the Society is "to promote and develop nationally the use and appreciation of watercolour and associated media among artists, students and the general public."

Exhibitions
The society held the first exhibition in 1871 at the courthouse in Lismore, County Waterford, and went on to exhibit at Clonmel, Carlow, and finally in 1891 the society begun an annual Spring Exhibition at Molesworth Hall, Dublin. The national collection for the society which consists of painting by 122 members was founded in 1993, and is housed at the Concert Hall of the University of Limerick. In 2004 the National Gallery held an exhibition, 150: The Watercolour Society of Ireland's Exhibitions. In 2009, the university published an illustrated book, The Silent Companion – An illustrated History of The Water Colour Society of Ireland. Almost 25,000 works by 1,200 artists are listed in the societies Exhibition List 1872–1994 (1994).

 Hugh Lane Municipal Gallery 1975 to 1980
 Bank of Ireland Exhibition Hall on Baggot Street from 1981 to 1988.
  Royal Hibernian Academy Gallagher Gallery, Ely Place, Dublin in 1989.
 Concourse Arts Centre at the Dún Laoghaire County Hall, County Dublin 1990–present.

Notable members
Past members include:

 Elizabeth Thompson, Lady Butler 
 Frederick William Burton 
 Rose Maynard Barton 
 Mildred Anne Butler
 Harry Clarke
 Gerald Dillon
 Lilian Davidson
 Phoebe Donovan
 Percy French
 Lady Ardilaun 
 May Guinness 
 Nathaniel Hone RHA 
 Evie Hone
 Walter Osborne RHA 
 Norah McGuinness
 Letitia Hamilton 
 Paul Henry
 Mainie Jellett
 Harry Kernoff
 Frank McKelvey
 Grania Langrishe
 Flora Mitchell 
 Sir William Orpen
 Bea Orpen 
 Kitty Wilmer O'Brien PRHA 
 Sarah Purser RHA 
 Nano Reid
 Æ (George William Russell)
 Susan Sex
 Gladys Wynne 
 Jack B. Yeats 
 Anne Yeats

See also
 List of Irish artists
 Royal Watercolour Society
 Royal Scottish Society of Painters in Watercolour
 Royal Hibernian Academy

References

Notes

Sources

Further reading

External links 
 
 
 

Watercolor societies
Cultural organisations based in the Republic of Ireland
1870 establishments in Ireland